Houssem Bnina (born 14 December 1994) is a Tunisian football defender who plays for Saudi club Al-Entesar.

References

1994 births
Living people
Tunisian footballers
JS Kairouan players
Stade Tunisien players
US Tataouine players
Al-Entesar Club players
Association football defenders
Tunisian Ligue Professionnelle 1 players
Saudi Second Division players
Tunisian expatriate footballers
Expatriate footballers in Saudi Arabia
Tunisian expatriate sportspeople in Saudi Arabia